Jackson Dean Nicholson (born October 6, 2000) is an American country music singer and songwriter. He signed to Big Machine Records in 2021 and has charted with the single "Don't Come Lookin'".

Biography
Dean was born in Odenton, Maryland. He left his hometown at age 18 to begin songwriting, which led to collaborations with Casey Beathard and Luke Dick. After serving as an opening act for Kane Brown, Jake Owen, and Brothers Osborne, he was signed to Big Machine Records in 2021. Dean's first release for Big Machine was a self-titled extended play with the single "Wings", the former of which was released on April 16, 2021.

Dean's debut single, "Don't Come Lookin'", was released in February 2022, followed by his debut album Greenbroke on March 11, 2022. In addition, he was booked as an opening act for Brooks & Dunn's Reboot 2022 Tour. "Don't Come Lookin'" has charted on Country Airplay in 2022. The song was also featured in an episode of the Paramount Network TV series Yellowstone.

Discography

Albums

Extended plays

Singles

References

American country singer-songwriters
Big Machine Records artists
Country musicians from Maryland
Date of birth unknown
Living people
People from Odenton, Maryland
2000 births